is a photojournalist best known for his depiction of the effects of mercury poisoning on people in and near Minamata over a period of some forty years.

Kuwabara was born — as Fumiaki Kuwabara (Kuwabara Fumiaki) — in the village of Kibe (now part of Tsuwano), Shimane Prefecture, Japan. In 1960 he graduated from the Tokyo University of Agriculture and Tokyo Photo School (later Tokyo College of Photography).

In the same year Kuwabara started work as a freelance photographer. With a letter of introduction from a journalist with Shūkan Asahi magazine, he visited the director of Minamata Municipal Hospital, Dr Noboru Ōhashi, in July, to ask for permission to photograph. Ōhashi gave him permission for long-term coverage.

Kuwabara's photographs of Minamata were shown in his first solo exhibition, Minamata-byō (Minamata disease), at the Fuji Photo Salon in Tokyo in September 1962. This won the newcomers' award of the Japan Photo Critics Association.

Kuwabara's works have also won an award  from Kodansha in 1965, the Photographic Society of Japan's Annual Award in 1971, and the Ina Nobuo Award in 1982.
 
Since 1997, Tsuwano has had a gallery largely devoted to Kuwabara's work. Until March 2004, this was called the Tsuwano Documentary Photograph Gallery; it was then renamed the Shisei Kuwabara Photographics  Museum.

Notes

Books by Kuwabara

Shashin-shū Minamata-byō / Minamata Desease [sic]. Tokyo: San'ichi Shobō, 1965.
Shashin-kiroku Minamata-byō 1960–1970 ( 1960–1970, "Documentary: Minamata disease"). Tokyo: Asahi Shinbun, 1970.
Seikatsusha gunzō ("Collage of living people"). Tokyo: San'ichi Shobō, 1980.
Minamata Kankoku Betonamu. Tokyo: Banseisha, 1982.
Tōji no sato Kōrai, Richō. Tokyo: Iwanami, 1984.
Kōrai, Richō gendai tōjisen. Tokyo: Mainichi Shinbun, 1985.
Kankoku genkei ("Korea's original scenes"). Tokyo: San'ichi Shobō, 1986.
Minamata ("Minamata"). Komichi Shobō, 1986.
Hōdōshashinka ("Documentary photographer"). Tokyo: Iwanami, 1989.
Kankoku shinjō toro ("Expressing genuine sentiments about Korea"). Tokyo: Ōtsuki, 1990. 
Yameru taikoku Roshia ("Russia, a sick great nation"). Tokyo: Heibonsha, 1995. 
Kuwabara Shisei / Minamata. Tokyo: Nihon Tosho Sentā, 1996.  Black and white photographs, in one volume (sold separately) of a multivolume set about pollution in Japan. In Japanese only.
Kuwabara Shisei shashin zenshū (The Complete Works of Kuwabara, Shinsei.) Tokyo: Kusa-no-Ne. Each of these four volumes contains explanatory text in English as well as Japanese.
1. Minamata (Minamata). 2004. 
2. Kankoku (South Korea). 1998. 
3. Chikuhō/Okinawa (Chikuho/Okinawa). 2004.  The first half is about the declining coalmines of Chikuho.
4. Betonamu (Vietnam). 1999. 
Imujin-gan: Kaima-mita Kita Chōsen ("Imjin-gang: Glimpses of North Korea"). Tokyo: Kusa-no-Ne, 2003.  Black and white photographs of North Korea. In Japanese only.

Other books with works by Kuwabara

Nihon shashin no tenkan: 1960 nendai no hyōgen / Innovation in Japanese Photography in the 1960s. Tokyo: Tokyo Metropolitan Museum of Photography, 1991.  Exhibition catalogue, text in Japanese and English. Pp. 104–113 are devoted to Kuwabara's photographs of Minamata.

External links
Official Website (Adobe Flash Player required)
 Minamata exhibition notice: contains some photographs
Tragedy to Triumph: an article about an exhibition in Seoul of Kuwabara's photographs of South Korea
 Shisei Kuwabara Photographics Museum 
Short CV

1936 births
Japanese photojournalists
Living people
Photography in Korea
Photography in Russia
People from Shimane Prefecture
Tokyo College of Photography alumni